Tegenaria parietina is a rather rare spider in Europe, with a distribution also including Northern Africa to Central Asia and Sri Lanka, and from the West Indies to Uruguay and Argentina, where it may have been introduced. In the UK it is sometimes known as the cardinal spider because of the legend that Cardinal Wolsey was terrified by this species at Hampton Court, or, conversely, because he regarded them as lucky and forbade anyone to harm them. In 2013, Tegenaria taprobanica was included in this species.

Appearance
Females have a body length up to 20 mm, males up to 17 mm. Their legs are approximately three times longer. They are reddish brown, but young spiders may be much paler up to the last moult. Up close, they are easily differentiated from T. domestica by the lengths of their legs: the front pair is almost as long as species in the genus Eratigena, while the hind pair is unshortened and similar to T. domestica. They also have more abundant hair on their tibias.

Females can live for up to eight years, while males die shortly after mating. These spiders live mostly in buildings or walls. They look rather similar to T. ferruginea.

Taxonomy
The species was first described by Antoine François de Fourcroy in 1785, as Aranea parietina. He called it "the brown domestic spider" that lived in the corners of rooms. It was given its current generic placement by Eugène Simon in 1875. It has been misidentified by several authors as Tegenaria domestica.

Tegenaria taprobanica was included in T. parietina by Bolzern et al. (2013), who considered that the very short original description of T. taprobanica would fit a very large specimen of T. parietina. The inclusion is recognized by the World Spider Catalog. Earlier sources treat T. taprobanica as a separate species.

References 

parietina
Agelenidae
Spiders of Africa
Spiders of Asia
Spiders of South America
Spiders described in 1785